Colin Quinn (8 October 1982 – 3 February 2022) was an Irish Gaelic footballer who played at club level with Stabannon Parnells and at inter-county level with the Louth senior football team. He usually lined out as a defender.

Career
Quinn first came to prominence as a Gaelic footballer at club level with Stabannon Parnells. He was just 17-years-old when he lined out at centre-back when Stabannon beat Kilkerley Emmets to win the Louth SFC title in 1999. Following on from this, Quinn captained the Louth senior football team in 1999 and was also named minor player of the year. He progressed onto the Louth under-21 football team, with whom he lined out for two seasons, and made his senior team debut in 2002. Quinn's inter-county career was a brief one, however, he continued to line out for Parnells at club level and served as team captain in 2004 and 2008.

Personal life and death
Quinn worked as a carpenter but emigrated to Australia following the 2007–08 economic downturn. He died on 3 February 2022, at the age of 40.

Honours

Stabannon Parnells
Louth Senior Football Championship: 1999

References

1982 births
2022 deaths
Louth inter-county Gaelic footballers
Stabannon Parnells Gaelic footballers
Irish emigrants to Australia